USS Capodanno (FF-1093) was the 42nd  in the United States Navy. It was named after Fr. Vincent Capodanno, recipient of the Medal of Honor.

Design and description
The Knox class design was derived from the  modified to extend range and without a long-range missile system. They displaced  at full load. Their crew consisted of 13 officers and 211 enlisted men.

The ships were equipped with one Westinghouse geared steam turbine that drove the single propeller shaft.

The Knox-class ships were armed with a 5"/54 caliber Mark 42 gun forward and a single 3-inch/50-caliber gun aft. They mounted an eight-round RUR-5 ASROC launcher between the  gun and the bridge. Close-range anti-submarine defense was provided by two twin  Mk 32 torpedo tubes. The ships were equipped with a torpedo-carrying DASH drone helicopter; its telescoping hangar and landing pad were positioned amidships aft of the mack. Beginning in the 1970s, the DASH was replaced by a SH-2 Seasprite LAMPS I helicopter and the hangar and landing deck were accordingly enlarged. Most ships also had the  gun replaced by an eight-cell BPDMS missile launcher in the early 1970s.

Construction and career
Since breaking her commissioning pennant on 17 November 1973, Capodanno continued to gain new honors in memory of her name sake, Lieutenant Vincent R. Capodanno, CHC, USN. On her first Mediterranean Sea deployment, she conducted search and rescue operations on four occasions resulting in the saving of 22 lives. Subsequent deployments were to the Middle East Force in 1976 and to South America in 1977.

Capodanno had her first extensive overhaul in 1978 in Bath, Maine. Following this overhaul she was assigned to Commander, Naval Surface Group FOUR with Newport, RI as her homeport. In 1979 she again deployed to the Mediterranean Sea and won the Battle Efficiency "E". In 1980 she participated in TEAMWORK "80" a major NATO Exercise and won another Battle "E". In 1981, the ship participated in her second UNTTAS deployment to South America.

In November 1982, Capodanno started her third Mediterranean deployment. She participated as a Naval Gunfire Support Ship in support of the Multi National Peace Keeping Force in Lebanon and earned the Navy Expeditionary Medal. Returning from this deployment she again had a major overhaul and modernization at the Bath Iron Works. In 1983, CAPODANNO earned her third Battle "E". 1984 saw the completion of overhaul and Refresher Training at Guantanamo Bay, Cuba.

In October 1985, Capodanno deployed on a Mediterranean/Indian Ocean deployment. This deployment included strike operations against Libya as part of the CORAL SEA Coral Sea Battle Group for which the ship was awarded the Navy Unit Commendation.

Returning in May 1986, Capodanno completed a short overhaul in Boston MA and completed Refresher Training in Cuba in March 1987. The remainder of 1987 was spent in Naval Gunfire Support and ASW Training. In September 1987, Capodanno participated in Ocean Safari 87 a Major NATO exercise in the Norwegian Sea and Fjords. On 29 February 1988, Capodanno started her fifth Mediterranean Sea deployment as an ASW line ship.

Turkish service

USS Capodanno was given to Turkey by the United States Navy as part of the restitution for the accident on TCG Muavenet (DM 357) in 1992. Decommissioned on 30 July 1993, Capodanno was subsequently leased to Turkey where she was recommissioned as TCG Muavenet (F-250). Stricken from the Navy list on 11 January 1995, Capodanno was finally sold to Turkey on 22 February 2002. The ship was removed from active service in 2012.

Notes

Decommissioning Naval Captain Mark Fischer

References

External links 

 Capodanno (DE-1093), Naval History and Heritage Command
 USS Capodanno (FF-1093) Facebook Page

Knox-class frigates
Ships built in Bridge City, Louisiana
1972 ships
Ships transferred from the United States Navy to the Turkish Navy
Cold War frigates and destroyer escorts of the United States